Thomas Edward Seats (September 24, 1910 – May 10, 1992) was a Major League Baseball pitcher for the Detroit Tigers (1940) and the Brooklyn Dodgers (1945). The ,  left-hander was a native of Farmington, North Carolina.

Seats was 2–2 for the Tigers in 1940, and then was 10–7 for the Dodgers five years later during World War II. He made his major league debut in relief on May 4, 1940, against the Philadelphia Athletics at Shibe Park. His first major league win came two days later, also in relief, in a 6–4 victory over the New York Yankees at Yankee Stadium. He pitched his first major league shutout on May 11, 1945 against the St. Louis Cardinals at Ebbets Field. The score was 7–0.

Seats' career totals for 57 games include a 12–9 record, 20 games started, 6 complete games, 2 shutouts, 14 games finished, and 1 save. He allowed 88 earned runs in 177 innings pitched for an ERA of 4.47.

Seats died at the age of 81 in San Ramon, California.

Trivia 
Even though he pitched just 121 innings in 1945, Seats tied for ninth among National League hurlers with 5 hit batsmen. By contrast, it took the other five pitchers who were tied with him for ninth an average of 179 innings to hit the same number of batters.

References

External links 

Retrosheet

Major League Baseball pitchers
Baseball players from North Carolina
Brooklyn Dodgers players
Detroit Tigers players
1910 births
1992 deaths
Lincoln Links players
Springfield Cardinals players
Asheville Tourists players
Houston Buffaloes players
Columbus Red Birds players
Sacramento Solons players
Decatur Commodores players
San Francisco Seals (baseball) players
San Diego Padres (minor league) players
Oakland Oaks (baseball) players
Hollywood Stars players
Eugene Larks players
People from Davie County, North Carolina